This is a list of listed buildings in Stevns Municipality, Denmark.

List

4600 Køge

4653 Karise

4660 Store Heddinge

4672 Klippinge

4673 Rødvig Stevns

References

External links

 Danish Agency of Culture

 
Stevns